Dudley Lester Pearson (February 8, 1896 – September 3, 1982) was a player in the National Football League for Racine Legion in 1922. He played at the collegiate level at the University of Notre Dame.

Biography
Pearson was born Dudley Lester Pearson on February 8, 1896, in Outagamie County, Wisconsin. He died in Milwaukee.

References

1896 births
1982 deaths
American football quarterbacks
Racine Legion players
Notre Dame Fighting Irish football players
Sportspeople from Appleton, Wisconsin
Players of American football from Wisconsin